Polystichum mohrioides is a fern in the family Dryopteridaceae. It is found only in the Falkland and South Georgia Islands in the South Atlantic Ocean.

References

mohrioides
Flora of the Falkland Islands
Flora of South Georgia Island
Ferns of the Americas
Taxa named by Carl Borivoj Presl